Streptomyces gulbargensis is an alkalitolerant and thermotolerant bacterium species from the genus of Streptomyces which has been isolated from soil from Gulbarga in the Karnataka in India.

See also 
 List of Streptomyces species

References

Further reading

External links
Type strain of Streptomyces gulbargensis at BacDive -  the Bacterial Diversity Metadatabase

gulbargensis
Bacteria described in 2009